Canindea maculata is a species of beetle in the family Cerambycidae. It was described by Galileo and Martins in 1990. It is known from Brazil.

References

Calliini
Beetles described in 1990